Apamea tahoeensis is a species of cutworm or dart moth in the family Noctuidae. It is found in North America.

The MONA or Hodges number for Apamea tahoeensis is 9339.2.

References

Further reading

 
 
 

Apamea (moth)
Articles created by Qbugbot
Moths described in 2009